Aiguille des Arias is a mountain of the French Alps in Isère. Located in the Massif des Écrins, the mountain is 3,403 m tall.

The mirror of Fétoules is a lake that has reflection of Tête de Lauranoure (3323 m) to right Le Bec du Canard (3269 m) and the l'Aiguille des Arias (3403 m) in the center.

References

 L'aiguille Arias in center

Mountains of the Alps
Alpine three-thousanders
Mountains of Isère